All-Russian Society of Philatelists was the first national philatelic organisation in Soviet Russia established in 1923. Later on, it was subsequently renamed and reorganised into the All-Union Society of Philatelists and the All-Union Society of Collectors.

History 
In Soviet Russia, the first philatelic organisation, Moscow Society of Philatelists and Collectors, appeared in 1918 in Moscow. In 1922, the idea of a new countrywide philatelic society was supported by the Russian Bureau of Philately at the RSFSR National Commissariat of Post and Telegraphs. On 15 March 1923, the charter of the All-Russian Society of Philatelists was approved. On 6 April 1923, its first meeting took place in Moscow.

In 1923, 643 collectors joined the All-Russian Society of Philatelists. The society's branches worked in Yerevan, Tiflis, Tashkent, Ashgabat, Baku, and other cities. In 1924–1925, the First All-Union Philatelic Exhibition was held. The All-Russian Society of Philatelists published the Soviet Philatelist magazine (1922–1932). It existed till the late 1930s.

See also 
 First All-Union Philatelic Exhibition
 International trading tax stamp
 Leniniana (philately)
 Moscow Society of Philatelists and Collectors
 Organisation of the Commissioner for Philately and Scripophily
 Philatelic International
 Philately
 Soviet Philatelic Association
 Soviet Philatelist

Notes

References

External links 
 
 

Philately of the Soviet Union
1923 establishments in the Soviet Union
1930s disestablishments in the Soviet Union
Non-profit organizations based in Russia
Philatelic organizations
Defunct organizations based in Russia
Organizations established in 1923